Stain in the Snow (French: La neige était sale) is a 1954 French crime film directed by Luis Saslavsky and starring Daniel Gélin, Valentine Tessier and Marie Mansart. It was shot at the Photosonor Studios in Paris. The film's sets were designed by the art director René Moulaert. It is based on a 1948 novel of the same title by Georges Simenon. It attracted audiences of over two million at the French box office. The setting if shifted from Nazi-occupied France to a fictional country under German occupation during the Second World War.

Synopsis
Frank is brought up in a brothel by his prostitute mother. As he grows up he becomes increasingly criminal and violent.

Cast
 Daniel Gélin as 	Frank Friedmayer
 Valentine Tessier as 	Mme Irma
 Marie Mansart as 	Suzy Holtz
 Daniel Ivernel as 	Krommer
 Véra Norman as 	Moune
 Nadine Basile as 	Bertha
 Paul Faivre as 	Le concierge
 Joëlle Bernard as 	Une fille
 Camille Guérini as Le commissaire
 Claude Vernier as 	L'officier
 Jo Dest as Un Allemand
 Robert Moor as 	Le professeur
 Jean-Pierre Mocky as Le violoniste 
 Antoine Balpêtré as 	Holtz 
 Georges Tabet as 	Un Allemand

References

Bibliography
 Goble, Alan. The Complete Index to Literary Sources in Film. Walter de Gruyter, 1999.
Walker-Morrison, Deborah. Classic French Noir: Gender and the Cinema of Fatal Desire. Bloomsbury Publishing, 2020.

External links 
 

1954 films
French crime films
1950s French-language films
1954 crime films
Films directed by Luis Saslavsky
Films based on Belgian novels
Films based on works by Georges Simenon
1950s French films